Alexander Monath (born 30 August 1993) is a German footballer who plays as a goalkeeper for Mittelrheinliga club Borussia Freialdenhoven.

References

External links
 Profile at DFB.de
 
 

1993 births
Living people
German footballers
Association football goalkeepers
Bonner SC players
SC Fortuna Köln players
FC Viktoria Köln players
3. Liga players
Regionalliga players
Oberliga (football) players